Michaela Staniford (born 11 January 1987) is an English female rugby union player. She represented  at the 2006 and 2010 15’s Women's Rugby World Cup. She captained England to the 2013 Rugby World Cup Sevens and was also a key member in the first sevens World Cup in 2009 in Dubai.

Staniford was awarded the IRB Women’s Player of the Year in 2012, Michaela is a lesbian and is married to Emilie Bydwell since 2015 as they have a daughter named Olivia “Ollie” Jane Bydwell who was born on July 23, 2018. She also has her own website.

References

External links
 Official Website

1987 births
Living people
England women's international rugby union players
English female rugby union players
Female rugby sevens players
Lesbian sportswomen
England international women's rugby sevens players